Mikiah "Kiki" Herbert Harrigan (born August 21, 1998) is a British basketball player who is currently a player for the London Lions . She played college basketball for the South Carolina Gamecocks.

College career
Herbert Harrigan finished her career second in blocked shots in the Gamecocks' program history. She joined Alaina Coates and A'ja Wilson as the only Gamecocks to amass over 1,000 points and 200 blocks in their careers. She averaged 13.1 points and 5.6 rebounds per game as a senior while shooting 50.6% overall and 43.5% on three-pointers. Herbert Harrigan earned the nickname “Mad Kiki’’ for her effort on defense.

Professional career
She was selected 6th overall in the 2020 WNBA draft by the Minnesota Lynx.
She finished her rookie season playing in 21 games averaging 3.8 ppg and shooting 42.2% from 3. 
June 20, 2020 Herbert Harrigan signed to Turkish Women's Basketball Team Kayseri Basketbol.

WNBA career statistics

Regular season

|-
| align="left" | 2020
| align="left" | Minnesota
| 21 || 0 || 11.1 || .366 || .424 || .714 || 2.3 || 0.3 || 0.4 || 0.4 || 0.7 || 3.8
|-
| align="left" | 2021
| align="left" | Seattle
| 1 || 0 || 1.0 || .000 || .000 || .000 || 0.0 || 0.0 || 0.0 || 0.0 || 0.0 || 0.0
|-
| align="left" | Career
| align="left" | 2 years, 2 teams
| 22 || 0 || 10.7 || .366 || .424 || .714 || 2.2 || 0.3 || 0.4 || 0.4 || 0.7 || 3.6

Playoffs

|-
| align="left" | 2020
| align="left" | Minnesota
| 3 || 0 || 9.7 || .600 || .500 || .500 || 1.7 || 0.0 || 0.0 || 0.3 || 1.0 || 3.0
|-
| align="left" | Career
| align="left" | 2 years, 2 teams
| 3 || 0 || 9.7 || .600 || .500 || .500 || 1.7 || 0.0 || 0.0 || 0.3 || 1.0 || 3.0

References

External links
South Carolina Gamecocks bio

1998 births
Living people
Anguillan expatriate sportspeople in the United States
Anguillan sportswomen
Basketball players from Florida
British expatriate basketball people in the United States
British women's basketball players
Minnesota Lynx draft picks
Minnesota Lynx players
Power forwards (basketball)
Seattle Storm players
South Carolina Gamecocks women's basketball players